Route 18 is a highway in western Missouri.  Its eastern terminus is at the intersection of Route 13/Route 52 and Route 7 in Clinton.  Its western terminus is at the Kansas state line near Drexel.  It continues into Kansas as a county road.

Route description

Route 18 begins at the Kansas state line just west of Drexel. It runs for three miles (5 km) along the Cass/Bates County line. Route 18 then turns south to Merwin, where it turns back east. It then runs through Adrian, before having a diamond interchange with the Interstate 49/U.S. Route 71 freeway. Route 18 then runs south of Altona and through Ballard. It then runs through Clinton. Route 18 then ends at Routes 7, 13, and 52.

Major intersections

References

018
Transportation in Bates County, Missouri
Transportation in Henry County, Missouri